Snooker world rankings 1983/1984: The professional world rankings for the top 32 snooker players in the 1983–84 season are listed below.

A ranking list was issued by the World Professional Billiards and Snooker Association (WPBSA) following the 1983 World Snooker Championship. Players' performances in the previous three World Snooker Championships (1981, 1982 and 1983 World Snooker Championship) contributed to their points total. For 1981 and 1982, the World Champion gained five points, the runner-up received four, losing semi-finalists got three, losing quarter-finalists got two, and losers in the last-16 round received a single point, whilst for 1983 the points were double this. For the first time, tournaments other than world championship were taken into account, with the 1982 International Open and 1982 Professional Players Tournament both at the same points tariff as the 1981 and 1982 World Championships. Players with no ranking points were ranked on the basis of their performance in the 1983 World Championship. Subsequently, an amended ranking list was issued following a vote by the WPBSA board to amend the rules so that players without any ranking points (which were those ranked lower than 28th) would receive one "merit" point if they had reached the last-32 of the World Championship; and half a merit point if they had reached the last 32 of the 1982 International Open, or the second round of the 1982 Professional Players Tournament.

Steve Davis was the top-ranked player for the first time, displacing Ray Reardon.

Rankings
The rankings are shown below. Merit points are indicated with a  symbol.

Notes

References

1983
Rankings 1984
Rankings 1983